Valeria Valeri (born  Valeria Tulli; 8 December 1921 – 11 June 2019) was an Italian actress and voice actress.

Biography

On stage
A student of actress Elsa Merlini, Valeri began her professional acting career in 1948, working on stage with fellow actors such as Gino Cervi, Ivo Garrani, Paolo Ferrari, Alberto Lupo, Alberto Lionello and Enrico Maria Salerno.

In 1958, Valeri joined the Compagnia Attori Associati, where she met Garrani and Salerno; with the latter she established a strong artistic and personal relationship. A tireless actress, from the mid 1990s, Valeri continued to perform on theatrical stages with dedication, mostly in light comedies.

Other activities
Valeri had a very short experience as a movie actress, especially due to the fact of being involved in several plays on stage. Despite this, Valeri has a very profitable career as a voice actress, giving her voice to actresses such as Julie Andrews, Ellen Burstyn, Natalie Wood, Maggie Smith and Anne Bancroft; she finished her dubbing career in 2008, four years after her last work, giving her voice to Mrs. Caloway in Home on the Range.

On the small screen, Valeri is remembered mainly for the one role that made her very popular in the 1960s: Mrs. Stoppani, mother of the restless Giannino Stoppani (portrayed by Rita Pavone) in the 1964 short series Il giornalino di Gian Burrasca, directed by Lina Wertmüller.

Personal life and death
Valeri has been romantically engaged with Enrico Maria Salerno. The two had a daughter, Chiara, who is also an actress and a voice actress. On 1 December 2015, Valeri was inducted as an honorary citizen of Forlì.

Valeri died in Rome on 11 June 2019, at the age of 97, from natural causes.

Filmography

Cinema
 Adriana Lecouvreur (1955)
 Lo scippo (1965)
 Seasons of Our Love (1966)
 Catherine and I (1980)

Dubbing roles

Animation
 Mrs. Caloway in Home on the Range
 Queen Angella in He-Man and She-Ra: The Secret of the Sword

Live action
Emily Barham in The Americanization of Emily
Lady Felicity Marshwood in Relative Values
Alice Hyatt in Alice Doesn't Live Here Anymore
Maggie DuBois in The Great Race
Dora Charleston in Murder by Death
D. R. Cartwright in 7 Women
Rhoda in A Fine Madness
Miranda Sampson in Harper
Monica in Indian Summer
Evelyn Gromberg in It Runs in the Family
Countess Elena Villani in Gangster's Law
Mali in Disorder
Countess Vitelleschi in Vanina Vanini

References

External links

1921 births
2019 deaths
Actresses from Rome
Italian voice actresses
Italian stage actresses
Italian film actresses
20th-century Italian actresses